Shota Dzidziguri (August 15, 1911, Matkhoji – December 14, 1994) was a Georgian linguist mainly focused on Georgian language and its dialects, basque researcher, PhD in philology, a member and Meritorious Artist of Georgian SSR Academy of Sciences (since 1974). His numerous publications concern the grammar and history of Georgian language, dialectal lexicography, onomastics, literary criticism etc. He supported the hypothesis of a genetic relationship of the Basque and Georgian language.

Bibliography
 Basques and Georgians, Tbilisi, 1982
 The Georgian Language (Short Review), 1969
 Life of the word, Tbilisi, 1988

References

 (Georgian) Georgian Soviet Encyclopedia, v. 11, pg. 278, Tbilisi, 1987.

1911 births
1994 deaths
20th-century philologists
Members of the Georgian National Academy of Sciences
Recipients of the Order of the Red Banner of Labour
Linguists from Georgia (country)
Linguists from the Soviet Union
Philologists from Georgia (country)
Scientists from Georgia (country)
Honoured Scientists of Georgia (country)